San Remo 1930 was the first international chess tournament held in the San Remo casino. Sixteen chess masters including the world champion Alexander Alekhine, played a round-robin tournament from 16 January to 4 February 1930. The games were played in the casino during the day, and in the evening the playing hall was used for dancing.

Alekhine dominated the field with a score of 14/15, 3½ points ahead of second-placed Aron Nimzowitsch, and won 10,000 lire.

The final standings and crosstable:

References

Further reading

Chess competitions
Chess in Italy
1930 in chess
1930 in Italian sport